"You Should Never Leave Me (Before I Die)" is a song by Slimmy, released in 2008 as the third and final single from his debut album Beatsound Loverboy. The song peaked at number 48 in the Portugal Singles Chart, making it Slimmy's lowest charted single to date.
"You Should Never Leave Me (Before I Die") was part of the soundtrack of the 6th season of the same soap opera.

Background
"You Should Never Leave Me (Before I Die)" was unveiled as the album's third and final single. The song was written by Slimmy and produced by Quico Serrano and Mark J Turner. It was also released to MySpace on 1 January 2007 and released as a digital single on November 25, 2008. "You Should Never Leave Me (Before I Die") was part of the soundtrack of the 6th season of the same soap opera.

Music video
The video was filmed at the Casa da Música and at the Máus Hábitos bar in Porto, Portugal. The video was directed and produced by António Vieira and co-produced by Up Town Films, the cinematographer was Paulo Castilho, Miguel Januário was the art director. It features a special guest, Nicole Cerbeckx.

The video starts in Casa da Música with Slimmy and Nicole dressed like samurai and preparing themselves to fight each others. The scene changes and we can see Slimmy and his band performing the song at the Máus Hábitos bar, while the lyrics of the songs are projected into a wall. This scene finishes when the first chorus of the song ends. Than, we can see Slimmy and Nicole fighting again against each other. This scene is seen til the beginning of the second chorus. During the second chorus, the scene of the performance in the bar is shown. in the bridge of the song, we can see Slimmy and Nicole in a room with orange lights, where Slimmy is defeated. During the rest of the bridge, Slimmy and Nicole are kissing each other with a white background, while the lyrics of the song are projected into it. In the last chorus of the song, we see the performance at the bar again. The video finishes with Nicole delivering a rose to Slimmy, who's already dead. She than looks behind her and she sees Slimmy with a cat in his arms and she goes to meet him.

Chart performance
The song entered at number 50 on the Portugal Singles Top 50 where it stayed for one week and peaked at number 48 where it stayed for more one week. It is Slimmy's lowest charted single to date

Live performances
 Sex and Love Tour
 A Very Slimmy Tour
 Be Someone Else Tour

Track listing
MySpace promotional single
"You Should Never Leave Me (Before I Die)" (album version) - 3:58

Digital single
"You Should Never Leave Me (Before I Die)" (album version) - 3:58

Personnel
Taken from the album's booklet.

Paulo Fernandes – main vocals, guitar
Paulo Garim – bass
Tó-Zé – drums

Release history

Charts

References

External links
Official music video at YouTube.

2008 singles
English-language Portuguese songs
2008 songs